Paula Moltzan (born April 7, 1994) is an American World Cup alpine ski racer and specializes in slalom.

Biography
Born to Robyn and Mark Moltzan and from Minnesota, Moltzan began racing at Buck Hill, south of Minneapolis. She competed at the World Championships in 2015 at Beaver Creek, finishing twentieth in the slalom. A month later she won gold in the slalom at the Junior World Championships at Hafjell, Norway.

Moltzan raced collegiately for the University of Vermont in Burlington and won the NCAA title in slalom in 2017 at Cannon Mountain, New Hampshire. She rejoined the World Cup circuit for the 2018–19 season and finished eighteenth in slalom at the World Championships in 2019.

At the 2022 Winter Olympics, Moltzan was eighth in the slalom, twelfth in the giant slalom, and fourth in the team event.

Her biggest influences are her cousin Allen and her uncle Scott.

World Cup results

Season standings

Race podiums
0 wins
2 podiums – (1 SL, 1 PG), 19 top tens

World Championship results

Olympic results

References

External links

 
 Paula Moltzan at U.S. Ski Team
 Paula Moltzan at University of Vermont Athletics

1994 births
Living people
American female alpine skiers
Vermont Catamounts skiers
People from Lakeville, Minnesota
Sportspeople from the Minneapolis–Saint Paul metropolitan area
21st-century American women
Alpine skiers at the 2022 Winter Olympics
Olympic alpine skiers of the United States